Neville Read Hudson  (10 October 1923 – 29 July 1980) was an Australian politician.

Early life and family
Neville Hudson was born in Brighton to accountant William Read Hudson and Nellie Frances Marion Downe. He attended Brighton Grammar School, and from 1941 to 1945 was a heavy bomber pilot with the Royal Australian Air Force, receiving the Distinguished Service Cross. From 1945 to 1947 he worked with the CSIRO, and from 1948 ran a dry cleaning business in Werribee. On 19 December 1947 he married Valda Ellis, with whom he had three sons. He had a farm at Bega from 1964 to 1970, after which he returned to Werribee.

Political career
A member of the Liberal Party, he was a Werribee Shire Councillor from 1961 to 1964 and from 1971 to 1978, serving as president from 1975 to 1976. In 1976 he was elected to the Victorian Legislative Assembly as the member for Werribee. His health declined from 1978 and he did not re-contest in 1979, passing away at Werribee the following year.

References

1923 births
1980 deaths
People educated at Brighton Grammar School
Liberal Party of Australia members of the Parliament of Victoria
Members of the Victorian Legislative Assembly
Australian recipients of the Distinguished Service Cross (United Kingdom)
20th-century Australian politicians
Royal Australian Air Force personnel of World War II
Australian World War II pilots
People from Brighton, Victoria
Military personnel from Melbourne
People from Werribee, Victoria
20th-century Australian businesspeople
Politicians from Melbourne
CSIRO people